National Highway 381B, commonly referred to as NH 381B, is an inter-corridor highway connecting Musiri along NH-81 with Namakkal along NH-44 in South India. It is a spur road of National Highway 81.  NH-381B traverses the state of Tamil nadu in India.

Route
NH 381B connects Musiri, Thottiyam, Ezlurpatty, Meikalnaikanpatty and Namakkal.

Junctions  
 
  Terminal near Musiri.
  Terminal near Namakkal.

See also 
 List of National Highways in India
 List of National Highways in India by state

References

External links
 NH 381B on OpenStreetMap

National Highways in Tamil Nadu
National highways in India